Devdad was the Sajid amir of Azerbaijan for a period in 901. He was the son of Muhammad al-Afshin. 

Devdad was installed as emir by the army following the death of his father in 901. After a reign of five months he was removed from power by his uncle Yusuf ibn Abi'l-Saj and the walls of Maragha were razed.

References
 

Sajid rulers
10th-century rulers in Asia
10th-century Iranian people